Leminster is a community in the Canadian province of Nova Scotia, located in the Municipal District of West Hants .

References
Leminster on Destination Nova Scotia

Communities in Hants County, Nova Scotia
General Service Areas in Nova Scotia